Leal can refer to:

People
Alicia Leal (born 1957), Cuban visual artist
Carlos Leal (born 1969), Swiss rapper and actor
Cassiano Leal (born 1971), Brazilian freestyle swimmer
Daniel Alsina Leal (born 1988), Spanish chess grandmaster
Danny Leal, lead singer of Upon A Burning Body
DeMarvin Leal (born 2000), American football player
Ernesto Leal (1945–2005), Nicaraguan politician
Fernando Leal Fonseca (born 1981), Brazilian footballer
Fernando Leal (artist) (1896–1964), Mexican painter
Francisco Aguilar y Leal  (1776–1840), soldier, Spanish merchant and one of the main leaders of Uruguayan independence
Hugo Leal (footballer) (born 1980), Portuguese footballer
Hugo Leal (politician) (born 1962), Brazilian politician
Ivonne Leal (born 1966), Cuban javelin thrower
Jaime Pardo Leal (1941–1987), Colombian lawyer, union leader and politician
Janine Leal (born 1976), Venezuelan television presenter and model.
Jeff Leal (born 1954), Canadian politician
John L. Leal (1858–1914), American physician and water treatment expert who conceived and installed the first drinking water chlorine disinfection system in the US
José Leal (born 1965), Portuguese footballer
Juan Leal ((1676–1742 or 1743), Spanish settler and politician, first alcalde of La Villa de San Fernando (which would become San Antonio, Texas)
Juan de Valdés Leal (1622–1690), Spanish painter and etcher
L. Gary Leal (born 1943), American chemical engineer and professor
Luis Leal (writer) (1907–2010), Mexican-American writer and literary critic
Luis Leal (baseball) (born 1957), Venezuelan baseball pitcher who played in Major League Baseball
Ninibeth Leal (born 1971), Venezuelan winner of the Miss World beauty pageant in 1991
Pedro Leal (footballer) (born 1989), Costa Rican football player
Pedro Leal (rugby union) (born 1984), Portuguese rugby player
Sergio Leal (born 1982), Uruguayan footballer 
Sharon Leal (born 1972), American actress
Walter Leal (born 1954), Brazilian-born American biochemist
Yoandy Leal (born 1988), Cuban volleyball player

Places
Leal, North Dakota, United States, a city
Lihula (German: Leal), Estonia, a town

LEAL
 ICAO airport code of Alicante–Elche Miguel Hernández Airport, Elche, Spain
 , a programming language for the CID-201 computer

Spanish-language surnames
Portuguese-language surnames